= Aftermath of World War =

Aftermath of World War may refer to:

- Aftermath of World War I
- Aftermath of World War II
